The Huoyan Mountain Ecology Museum is a museum of ecology about Huoyan Mountain in Sanyi Township, Miaoli County, Taiwan.

Transportation
The museum is accessible within walking distance south from Sanyi Station of the Taiwan Railways.

See also
 List of museums in Taiwan

References

External links
  

Museums with year of establishment missing
Natural history museums in Taiwan
Museums in Miaoli County